Konaran or Kenaran or Kanaran may refer to:
 Kanaran (guru), Keralite guru
 Konaran, Hormozgan
 Konaran, Kerman
 Konaran, Sistan and Baluchestan